The 2016 Boels Rental Hills Classic is a one-day women's cycle race held in the Netherlands, from Sittard to Berg en Terblijt over 131.4 km on 27 May 2016. The race had a UCI rating of 1.1.

Results

See also

 2016 in women's road cycling

References

Boels Rental Hills Classic
Holland Hills Classic
Boels Rental Hills Classic